Kenimekh is an urban-type settlement and seat of Kenimekh district in Navoiy Region in Uzbekistan. The town population in 1989 was 7,750 people.

References

Populated places in Navoiy Region
Urban-type settlements in Uzbekistan